The VGM Gastro Centre is a specialist hospital located at Singanallur in Coimbatore, India. The centre was  established in 2009 with 100 beds to treat patients and an intensive care unit. In 2012, former Tamil Nadu Governor Konijeti Rosaiah laid the foundation for a new block to house an advanced gastroenterology unit.

Specialities 
The specialties services offered at the hospital are,
 Medical gastroenterology
 Surgical gastroenterology
 Oncology
 Critical Care
 (HPB) and liver transplantation

Projects 
To safeguard children aged between four and twelve in poor families against Hepatitis B infection that could damage the liver will be given one free dose of vaccination and two more doses at Rs.50 a dose under a project led by Dr. V.G. Mohan Prasad  which is jointly organized by Rotary Club of Coimbatore East and VGM Hospital, Coimbatore.

Public awareness 
In October 2010 V.G.M. Hospital and The Hindu teamed up to generate awareness among the people on hepatitis in Coimbatore.

VGM Hospital, Coimbatore, have launched a free check-up and investigations at an affordable price for cancer screening on the observance of World Cancer Day until February 11, 2019. The chairman of the hospital, Dr V.G. Mohan Prasad, said that 2-4 cases of cancer are diagnosed every day at the hospital.

Awards 
City-based gastroenterologist Dr V G Mohan Prasad received the state government's ‘Best Doctor’ award from health minister Dr.C.Vijayabaskar in Chennai on August 22, 2019, for his work in the field of liver diseases.

References

External links 
 Official Website

Hospitals in Tamil Nadu
Hospitals established in 2009
2009 establishments in Tamil Nadu
Buildings and structures in Coimbatore